Cambo is a village and former civil parish, now in the parish of Wallington Demesne, in Northumberland, England. The village was gifted along with the Wallington Estate to the National Trust by Sir Charles Philips Trevelyan in 1942, the first donation of its kind. It remains a National Trust village. In 1951 the parish had a population of 60.

There is a village school, Cambo First School, which had 46 pupils in September 2020 aged 4-9 years. There is a church, a village hall and a community orchard in the village.

Governance 
Cambo was formerly a township and chapelry in Hartburn parish, from 1866 Cambo was a civil parish in its own right until it was abolished on 1 April 1955 and merged with Wallington Demesne.

Notable people 
Capability Brown, the 18th-century landscape gardener, was educated at the village school. He was born at nearby Kirkharle.

References

External links

Panoramic Photographs by Peter Loud of Village and Holy Trinity Church, Cambo.
Northumberland county council's page on Cambo

Villages in Northumberland
Former civil parishes in Northumberland